The 2021 European Mixed Team Badminton Championships is held in Vantaa, Finland, between 16 and 20 February 2021 and organised by Badminton Europe and Badminton Finland. Milton Keynes in England was the original host for the championships, but withdrew due to financial issues related to COVID-19 pandemic and replaced by Finland.

Qualification

Direct qualifiers
 (Host country)
 (Reigning champion)

Qualification stage 

The qualification stage was held between 9–12 December 2020 in 6 cities across Europe. Two of the qualification events in Germany and France had to be cancelled due to COVID-19 concerns.

§: Subgroup's winner.
: Cancelled due to the withdrawal of 3 out of 4 teams.
: Cancelled due to the qualification stage cannot be hosted in France or any of the other countries participating in this group.
: Lithuania withdrew from this qualification stage.

Group stage

Group 1 

Denmark vs. Finland

Scotland vs. Germany

Denmark vs. Germany

Scotland vs. Finland

Denmark vs. Scotland

Germany vs. Finland

Group 2 

England vs. Russia

France vs. Netherlands

England vs. Netherlands

France vs. Russia

England vs. France

Netherlands vs. Russia

Knockout stage

Semi-finals

Final

References

2021
European Mixed Team Badminton Championships
2021 European Mixed Team Badminton Championships
European Mixed Team Badminton Championships
European Mixed Team Badminton Championships